William Brickly Stokes (September 9, 1814 – March 14, 1897) was an American politician and a member of the United States House of Representatives from Tennessee. He also served as colonel of the 5th Regiment Tennessee Volunteer Cavalry during the American Civil War.

Biography
He was born on September 9, 1814 in Chatham County, North Carolina. He attended the common schools, moved with his family to Temperance Hall, Tennessee, and engaged in agricultural pursuits. He was a member of the Tennessee House of Representatives from 1849 to 1852. He served in the Tennessee Senate in 1855 and 1856. Stokes owned between seven and ten enslaved people in Tennessee.

Stokes was elected as a member of the Opposition Party to the Thirty-sixth Congress by Tennessee's 4th congressional district, serving from March 4, 1859 to March 4, 1861. He entered the Union Army on May 15, 1862 as a major of the Tennessee Volunteers. He served as colonel of the 5th Regiment Tennessee Volunteer Cavalry until he resigned on March 10, 1865. He briefly served in temporary brigade command in the Army of the Ohio between June 17, 1863 and August 6, 1863. On December 24, 1866, President Andrew Johnson nominated Stokes for the award of the honorary grade of brevet brigadier general to rank from March 13, 1865. The U.S. Senate confirmed the award on February 21, 1867. He studied law, was admitted to the bar in 1867, and commenced practice in Alexandria, Tennessee in DeKalb County, Tennessee.

Upon the readmission of Tennessee to representation, he was elected as an Unconditional Unionist to the Thirty-ninth Congress by Tennessee's 3rd congressional district. He was re-elected as a Republican to the Fortieth and Forty-first Congresses. He served in the U.S. House of Representatives from July 24, 1866 to March 4, 1871. He was an unsuccessful candidate for re-election in 1870 to the Forty-second Congress. He also was the supervisor of internal revenue for Tennessee. He resumed the practice of law and died in Alexandria, Tennessee on March 14, 1897. He was interred in East View Cemetery at Alexandria.

Notes

See also

List of American Civil War brevet Generals (Union)

References
 Eicher, John H., and David J. Eicher. Civil War High Commands. Stanford, CA: Stanford University Press, 2001. .
 Retrieved on 2008-08-16'

External links

1814 births
1897 deaths
People from Chatham County, North Carolina
Opposition Party members of the United States House of Representatives from Tennessee
Unconditional Union Party members of the United States House of Representatives from Tennessee
Tennessee Oppositionists
Tennessee Unconditional Unionists
Republican Party members of the United States House of Representatives from Tennessee
Republican Party members of the Tennessee House of Representatives
Republican Party Tennessee state senators
People of North Carolina in the American Civil War
People of Tennessee in the American Civil War
Union Army colonels
Southern Unionists in the American Civil War
19th-century American politicians